Lene Adler Petersen (born January 1944 in Aarhus, Denmark) is a Danish artist. Her artistic practice is characterized through a continuous collecting, sorting and mixing process of media and techniques and includes happenings and performance art as well as painting, ceramics, drawings, printmaking and installations, film and photography.

Biography
Lene Adler Petersen was educated at Det Jyske Kunstakademi 1964-66 and The Royal Danish Academy of Fine Arts 1968-69. Adler Petersen stems from a generation of Danish artists who came to visibility in the 1960s through performance art, installation art and film.

Lene Adler Petersen´s interest in collecting and sorting play a crucial role in her diverse artistic expressions. Her political conceptual work is characterized by an investigation into the contemporary representations of women. Lene Adler Pedersens early work "Uddrivelsen fra templet, nøgen kvindelig Kristus, d. 29. maj, kl. 15.50, 1969, Børsen" is a performance made together with artist Bjørn Nørgaard. In the performance she walked naked with a cross through the Copenhagen Stock Exchange.

By the time she completed her study of visual arts at the Royal Danish Academy, she was already part of the experimental art scene in Copenhagen formed around Eks-skolen. During that period she worked primarily as filmmaker, painter and a collage artist besides engaging and contributing to the collaborative work in the Danish art community. Throughout her life Lene Adler Petersen has been involved in several artist groups as ABCinema, Eks-skolens trykkeri, Tidskriftet Kvinder and Arme and Ben. She has been a member of the Danish artists association Kammeraterne since 1995.

Since the 1960s Adler Petersen has created a rich collection of drawings. She has significantly influenced a generation of younger Danish artists by making way for the making of conceptual and feminist art in Scandinavia. Her interests in creativity, the role of subjectivity and personal history form a unique artistic position that challenges conventional paradigmas of gender, female representation and artistic production.

Lene Adler Petersen is represented in private institution and museums among others; The National Gallery of Denmark, Aarhus Kunstmuseum, Kunsten and Kobberstiksamlingen. Adler Petersen is married to the artist Bjørn Nørgaard.

Selected works 

 1967-71 "Dagsbogsfilm I-V og Arkivfilm". 8mm film in collaboration with Bjørn Nørgaard.
 1969. "Uddrivelsen fra templet, nøgen kvindelig Kristus, d. 29. maj, kl. 15.50, 1969, Børsen". Happening in collaboration with Bjørn Nørgaard.
 1972 "3 piger og en Gris". 16mm film in collaboration with Ursula Reuter Christiansen, Elisabeth Therkildsen and Per Kirkeby.
 1974 "Udklip på papir med Kvindetegnet". 484 cut-outs on paper and collage.
 1974 "Dagbog fra mørkekammeret på Eks-skolens Trykkeri". Photography.
 1976 ’Tingene, Din Historie, Befri Dig for Tingene (Friheden Fører Folket)’ in the Collection of Statens Museum for Kunst.  
 1977 "Tag en sten op". 1200 drawings.
 1983 "Portrættet af Rita fra Aarhus". Collage and spray. Serial work in the periode 1976 -1983.

Publications and artist books 

 1971 "Se mor". Nansensgade 1971 / Sangen Om Kaffekoppen (10"), New Edition by Institut for Dansk Lydarkæologi.
 1975 "Billedlotteri". New edition by Museet for Samtidskunst, Danmark.
 1977 "Tag En Sten Op". (317 pages) Publisher Borgen.
 1980 "Ting, nogle parforhold". (31 pages) Edition of Lene Adler Petersen.
 1982 "Motivet". (32 pages) Published by Galleri Specta.
 1983 "Fire Parader/ Tegninger". Eks-Skolens Forlag.
 2003 "Et Håndklæde/ A Towel". Drawings on Paper. (91 pages) Eks-Skolens Trykkeri Aps.
 2010 "Kvindetegnet". Gyldendal.

Public collections 

 Statens Museum for Kunst Kobberstiksamlingen
 ARoS Aarhus Kunstmuseum
 Ny Carlsberg Glyptotek
 Kunsten Museum of Modern Art Aalborg Randers Kunstmuseum
 Horsens Kunstmuseum
 Silkeborg Kunstmuseum
 Esbjerg Kunstmuseum
 Vejle Kunstmuseum
 Skive Kunstmuseum
 Fyns Kunstmuseum
 Kastrupgaardsamlingen
 Kunstmuseet Køge Skitsesamling
 Designmuseum Danmark

References 

 https://soeg.kb.dk/ Royal National Library Denmark search Lene Adler Petersen.  
 Danish Artists' Books. Møller &Verlag der Buchhandlung Walther König.

 Dansk Kvindebiografisk Leksikon – Lene Adler Petersen
 Kunstindeks Danmark/Weilbachs Kunstnerleksikon - Lene Adler Petersen
 http://www.smk.dk/en/explore-the-art/search-smk/ - Lene Adler Petersen

1944 births
Living people
20th-century Danish artists
21st-century Danish artists
20th-century Danish women artists
21st-century Danish women artists
People from Aarhus
Royal Danish Academy of Fine Arts alumni